Beauport may refer to:

Beauport, Quebec City
Beauport—Limoilou, a federal electoral district in Beauport, Quebec City
Battle of Beauport, 1759
Beauport (Gloucester, Massachusetts)
Beauport Harfangs, an ice hockey team
Lac-Beauport, Quebec
Beauport Park, East Sussex, England
Abbey of Beauport, Paimpol, France